Randy José Lerú Bell (born November 7, 1995) is a Cuban male artistic gymnast and a member of the national team. He participated at the 2015 World Artistic Gymnastics Championships in Glasgow, and qualified for the 2016 Summer Olympics.

References

External links 
 

1995 births
Living people
Cuban male artistic gymnasts
People from Santiago de Cuba
Gymnasts at the 2015 Pan American Games
Gymnasts at the 2019 Pan American Games
Gymnasts at the 2016 Summer Olympics
Olympic gymnasts of Cuba
Central American and Caribbean Games bronze medalists for Cuba
Competitors at the 2014 Central American and Caribbean Games
Central American and Caribbean Games medalists in gymnastics
Pan American Games competitors for Cuba
20th-century Cuban people
21st-century Cuban people